El Burro is a wetland, part of the Wetlands of Bogotá, in the locality Kennedy, Bogotá, Colombia.

Flora and fauna

Flora 
Flora registered in the wetland land include common duckweed (Lemna minor) and swamp smartweed (Polygonum hydropyperoides), among other plant species.

Birds 
El Burro has 33 registered bird species, among others the common moorhen (Gallinula chloropus) and yellow-hooded blackbird (Agelaius icterocephalus).

Panorama

See also 

Biodiversity of Colombia, Bogotá savanna, Thomas van der Hammen Natural Reserve
Wetlands of Bogotá

References

Bibliography

External links 
  Fundación Humedales de Bogotá
  Conozca los 15 humedales de Bogotá - El Tiempo

Wetlands of Bogotá